Saint is a name shared by several notable people.

Surname 
Crosbie E. Saint (1936-2018), American general
Eva Marie Saint (born 1924), American actress
H. F. (Harry F. ) Saint (born 1941), American author
Johnny Saint (born 1941), English professional wrestler
Lawrence Saint (1885–1961), American stained glass artist
Nate Saint (1923–1956), American evangelical missionary pilot killed in Ecuador (brother of Rachel)
Rachel Saint (1914–1994), American evangelical Christian missionary who worked in Ecuador (sister of Nate)
Silvia Saint (born 1976), Czech porn actress
Steve Saint (born 1951), Ecuadorian/American business entrepreneur, pilot and author (son of Nate)

Given name 
Saint West, son and middle child of Kanye West and Kim Kardashian

See also
 Saint (disambiguation)